Nikos Alavantas (born 13 April 1959) is a Greek former professional footballer who played as a right-back.

During his club career, Alavantas played for PAOK and Xanthi. He also amassed 31 caps for the Greece national football team.

References

External links
 

1959 births
Living people
Greek footballers
Greece international footballers
Association football defenders
PAOK FC players
Xanthi F.C. players
Super League Greece players
People from Evros (regional unit)
Footballers from Eastern Macedonia and Thrace